Serenade in A is a work for solo piano by Russian composer Igor Stravinsky. Completed on September 9, 1925, in Vienna and published by Boosey & Hawkes, it resulted from his signing his first gramophone recording contract, for Brunswick, and was written so that each movement could fit on one side of a 78 rpm record. The dedicatee was Stravinsky's wife Katya.

Structure 
Serenade in A lasts about twelve minutes and is in four movements:

Despite its title, the work is in neither A major nor A minor. According to Eric White, A is not the "key" of the work, but rather the music radiates from and tends towards A as a "tonic pole". Thus, the first and the last chord of each movement contains the note A, either as the root, third, or fifth of a triad. Therefore, the movement titles are meant to evoke the specific parts of such festive celebration.

From the pianist's perspective "Hymne" is related to  Frédéric Chopin's Ballade No. 2, while the "" reflects Stravinsky's Russian heritage.

References

Further reading 
 Boettcher, Bonna J. 1991. A Study of Stravinsky's Sonate pour piano (1924) and Sérénade en la. San Francisco: Mellen Research University. .
 Cone, Edward T. 1962. "Stravinsky: The Progress of a Method". Perspectives of New Music 1, no. 1 (Fall): 18–26.
 Joseph, Charles M. 1983. Stravinsky and the Piano. Russian Music Studies 8. Ann Arbor: UMI Research Press.
 Martins, José António Oliveira. 2006. "Stravinsky's Discontinuities, Harmonic Practice, and the Guidonian Space in the 'Hymne' from the Serenade in A". Theory and Practice 31:39–63.
 Straus, Joseph N. 1987. "The Problem of Coherence in Stravinsky's Sérénade in la". Theory and Practice 12:3–10.
 White, Eric Walter. 1948. Stravinsky: A Critical Survey, 1882–1946. New York: Philosophical Library. Reprinted, Mineola, NY: Courier Dover Publications, 1997. .

1925 compositions
Compositions for solo piano
Compositions by Igor Stravinsky